PNS Taimur may refer to following ships of Pakistan Navy:

 , the former British  destroyer HMS Chivalrous (R21) acquired by Pakistan in 1954 and returned to the Royal Navy in 1961 prior to scrapping.
 , the former United States  USS Epperson (DD-719) acquired by the Pakistan Navy in 1977 and renamed. She was sunk as a target in 1980.
 , a Type 054A/P frigate

Pakistan Navy ship names